Cured Duck is a 1945 American animated cartoon produced by Walt Disney and directed by Jack King. It stars Clarence Nash as the voice of Donald and Gloria Blondell as the voice of Daisy, respectively. The cartoon features Donald going to visit Daisy, but his temper control problems cause him to wreck the house and get kicked out. To cure himself of his temper, he gets a machine that proceeds to deliver physical and angering abuse.

Plot
Donald decides to visit Daisy at her home. Daisy is first annoyed by Donald blowing smoke from his cigar into her face. Daisy asks Donald to open the windows. Donald struggles and strains to open it, but it won't budge. Donald strains so hard his face sweats, turns red with anger, and he nearly tears the house apart with his straining, but still the window doesn't move. This causes Donald to enter an uncontrolled and maniacal rage. He smashes the window, tears down curtains, rips a refrigerator off its base, destroys a sofa, destroys some dishes, and even rips telephones and power lines through the wall, virtually wrecking the house. Daisy is appalled at his behavior and shows Donald that he just needed to turn the little knob atop the frame to open it. Disappointed, she tells him, "Temper, temper, shame on you. You never see me lose my temper, do you?" Upset at how easily he got angry, she orders Donald to leave and she refuses to go out with him until he can control his temper.

While trudging through the streets, Donald sees an ad in a newspaper, from the Tootsberry Institute, promising a way to cure temper issues. They send an "anger control machine" to Donald which promises that if Donald can take its taunts for 10 minutes, and still control his temper, he'll be cured forever. The machine abuses Donald in numerous ways, from punching him, clipping the buttons off his sailor suit (a clever, in-universe explanation for why his buttons never re-appear after this cartoon: they were eliminated to increase animation pencil mileage), pummeling his feet with a brick, and even blaring loud sounds into his ear. After 10 minutes, Donald is still standing, and has not lost his temper. At this point, the machine declares that he's done it!

Donald eagerly races back to Daisy's, to tell her that he's changed. She decides to test this by having him open the window. Donald manages to turn the little knob atop the window, but still struggles to get it open. He eventually uses a fire cleaning tool to hold the window open again, but it still falls down. Just when it seems he's succeeded, the glass in the window pane falls out and smashes over his head. But even though this happens, Donald still remains in good spirits. Daisy is pleased, and decides to go out with Donald. She rushes upstairs, and returns wearing a strange-looking hat for their date. Donald laughs at her hat, only to have her lose her temper - for the first time ever - and begins hitting Donald with her broom.

Voice cast
 Donald Duck: Clarence Nash
 Daisy Duck: Gloria Blondell
Radio Announcer: Frank Graham

Notes
This is not the first episode where Donald tries to find a way to cure his temper; the first one was Self Control (1938). However, this one differs from Self Control in that Donald has better luck learning to control his temper (he returns to his old angry self at the end of the former episode). His curing in Cured Duck seems to be more successful; Although he still has a temper, his outbursts are less frequent and intense.

Home media
The short was released on December 6, 2005 on Walt Disney Treasures: The Chronological Donald, Volume Two: 1942-1946.

References

External links
 
 

Donald Duck short films
1945 animated films
1945 short films
1945 films
1940s Disney animated short films
Films directed by Jack King
Films produced by Walt Disney
Films scored by Oliver Wallace
1940s English-language films